Chaetocanace is a genus of beach flies in the family Canacidae. All known species are Asian or Australasian.

Species
C. brincki Delfinado, 1975
C. biseta (Hendel, 1913)

References

Canacidae
Carnoidea genera